The Guarantee is a 2014 Irish drama film written by Colin Murphy, and starring David Murray, Gary Lydon, Orla Fitzgerald, Morgan C. Jones and Peter Coonan. Directed by Ian Power, and based on Murphy's play of the same title, the film explores the events leading up to the Irish banking crisis, the title referring to a meeting of high-level officials that was held on 29 September 2008 and resulted in the Irish Government taking the decision to guarantee Ireland's entire domestic banking system. The film was produced by John Kelleher Media in association with the Broadcasting Authority of Ireland, the Irish Film Board and the commercial television channel TV3.

A trailer for the film was released on 14 October 2014, and it debuted in Irish cinemas on 30 October. The Guarantee received its world television premiere on Ireland's TV3 at 9.00 p.m. on 8 January 2015.

References

External links

2014 films
Brian Cowen
Cultural depictions of Taoisigh
English-language Irish films
Films set in the Great Recession
Irish drama films
Post-2008 Irish economic downturn
2014 drama films
2010s English-language films